Meskwaki Settlement School (MSS) is a tribally controlled school with oversight by the Bureau of Indian Education, is located in the Meskwaki Nation, also known as the Meskwaki Settlement.

History
The Sac and Fox Settlement School was originally established as a Day School by the Bureau of Indian Affairs.
The school then became part of the South Tama County Community School District, and then closed in 1972. After application by the tribal members to the Bureau of Indian Education, the school re-opened in 1980 as a tribally operated school.

Athletics
The Warriors compete in the Iowa Star Conference in the following sports:

Cross Country (boys and girls)
Volleyball
Football
Basketball (boys and girls)
Bowling
Wrestling
Swimming
Track and Field (boys and girls)
Tennis
Soccer (boys and girls)
Golf (boys and girls)
Baseball 
Softball

See also
Meskwaki
Meskwaki Settlement, Iowa
List of school districts in Iowa
List of high schools in Iowa

References

External links
 Meskwaki Settlement School
 The Meskwaki Settlement School

Public high schools in Iowa
Education in Tama County, Iowa
1980 establishments in Iowa
School districts established in 1980
Native American K-12 schools